Chotila is a Hindu temple town and Taluka headquarters of Chotila Taluka, Surendranagar district, located near Rajkot, Gujarat, India.

Nearby railway stations included Than & Rajkot. The distance from the Than junction to Chotila is 21 km and Distance from Rajkot railway junction to Than is 47 km.

History

Chotila was known as Chotgadh in ancient times. It was originally a holding of the Sodha Parmars, but was seized from Jagsio Parmar by the Khachar Kathis who made it one of their principal seats. Most of the Khachar Kathis trace their origin to the Chotila house. Chotila was acquired by the Kathis in 1566 AD. It is the headquarters of an Agency thana during British period.
Famous literary, Jhaverchand Meghani was born in Chotila and the Government College has been named in his honor as Raashtreeya Shaayar Zaverchand Meghani College.

Demographics
The population, according to the census of 1872, was 1771, and according to that of 1881 was recorded as being 2029 . It currently has a population of nearly 20,000.

Places of interest
The Chamund or Chotila hill which is surmounted by the temple of Chamunda is 1173 feet in height. The temple is reached by climbing 620 steps. The temple is open for devotees from 5 am to 5:30 pm.

Administration
The town is administered by Nagarpalika.

See also
Jhaverchand Meghani

Sayla

References

 This article incorporates text from a publication now in the public domain: 

Shakti temples
Hindu temples in Gujarat
Princely states of Gujarat
Kathi princely states
Cities and towns in Surendranagar district
Taluka of Surendranagar
Tourist attractions in Surendranagar district